The Illinois Department of Corrections (IDOC) is the code department of the Illinois state government that operates the adult state prison system. The IDOC is led by a director appointed by the Governor of Illinois, and its headquarters are in Springfield.

The IDOC was established in 1970, combining the state's prisons, juvenile centers, and parole services. The juvenile corrections system was split off into the Illinois Department of Juvenile Justice on July 1, 2006.

Facilities

Crossroads and North Lawndale Adult Transition Centers are operated by the Safer Foundation.

Closed prisons

 Alton Military Prison: open 1833 through 1857, replaced by Joliet; operated as a military prison during the Civil War
 Decatur Adult Transition Center; closed 2012
 Dwight Correctional Center: closed in 2013; maximum security
 Hardin County Work Camp; closed 2015; low minimum
 Jesse 'Ma' Houston Adult Transition Center: closed 2011; transitional facility
 Kankakee Minimum-Security Unit; low minimum, closed 2010
 Southern Illinois Adult Transition Center; closed 2012
 Tamms Correctional Center: closed in 2013; maximum security
 Tamms Minimum Security Unit: low minimum
 Thomson Correctional Center, a maximum security facility built in 2001 near Thomson, Illinois, was sold by the state to the federal government in 2012, and was subsequently renamed the Administrative United States Penitentiary, Thomson (AUSP Thomson). In January 2019, the prison facility was fully activated by the Federal Bureau of Prisons. In March 2020, the prison facility was renamed the United States Penitentiary, Thomson (USP Thomson).

Security levels
The Illinois Department of Corrections uses a three level security designation system that encompasses three points of data. The initial classification is performed at one of the reception facilities located throughout the state. Classification reviews are performed periodically on offenders at their assigned facilities. The primary points of data are security level, offender grade, and escape level. Within each security level there are additional specifics that separate each security level into additional levels.

Security Levels: 1 – Maximum, 2 – Medium, 3 – Minimum, P – Pending (Reception/Classification Status)

Offender Grades: A, B, C

Escape Level: (L)ow, (M)oderate, (H)igh, (E)xtremely High, (P)ending (Reception/Classification Status)

The offender classification is designated in the example below:

2 (Security Level); A (Offender Grade); L (Escape Risk Level)

Within the Medium and Minimum security levels there are multiple levels of security as shown in the list of facilities above. There are several factors which determine the level of security at a facility level. A table below will highlight some of the most important distinctions. An offender can be housed at a facility one level lower than his current security classification for a limited period of time if located in the Segregation Unit while a transfer is pending after reclassification.

Offender grades are part of the discipline system utilized within the facilities. Offenders are initially assigned to A grade and afforded all privileges. B grade is a transitional grade for offenders moving back to A grade after demotion to C grade. C grade restricts telephone usage, commissary purchases to cosmetic/legal items, and prohibits many work and school assignments.

The escape risk system utilizes a metric to indicate the likelihood that an offender would attempt escape. Several factors are used to determine this metric including but not limited to crime of conviction, criminal history, history of escape attempts, and outstanding warrants. An oddity within the Moderate Escape Risk designation should be noted. This escape level is used for two completely different purposes. In one case this level is assigned to offenders who would otherwise be a low risk when placed in a higher security facility. For example, Dixon Correctional Center houses the majority of offenders with serious health problems. Offenders serving long sentences who are moved to this Level 3 facility will usually be assigned the moderate escape risk level as part of the reclassification performed to assign an offender with medical problems to this facility where they would otherwise remain at Level 1/2. The other use for this escape level is where an offender has an outstanding warrant or has absconded from parole or work release during the last 24 months. Offender identification cards indicate the escape level by utilizing a color coded background. Low escape risks have a white background, moderate escape risks have a blue background, high escape risks have a red background, and extremely high escape risks have a green background. Additionally, extremely high escape risks wear a green shirt and have a green stripe down their pant legs.

Offenders with special security clearances, such as outside clearance, special assignment clearances, or multi-level facility indicators (SMC for example at Dixon) will have data on the back of their offender identification cards.

Death row

Illinois had the death penalty until it was abolished in 2011.  Illinois's last execution was Andrew Kokoraleis, on March 17, 1999.

Pontiac Correctional Center housed the male death row, while Dwight Correctional Center housed the female death row. Prior to the January 11, 2003 commutation of death row sentences, male death row offenders were housed at Pontiac, Menard, and Tamms correctional centers. The execution chamber was located at Tamms Correctional Center. Prior to the opening of Tamms Correctional Center's CMAX section in March 1998, inmates were executed at Stateville Correctional Center.

See also

 List of law enforcement agencies in Illinois
 List of United States state correction agencies
 List of U.S. state prisons
 Dwight Correctional Center

References

External links
Illinois Department of Corrections — official site
 TITLE 20, CHAPTER I: DEPARTMENT OF CORRECTIONS of the Illinois Administrative Code

Government agencies established in 1970
 
Lists of United States state prisons
State law enforcement agencies of Illinois
1970 establishments in Illinois
State corrections departments of the United States